Hypolycaena xenia is a butterfly in the family Lycaenidae. It was described by Henley Grose-Smith in 1895. It is found in southern Sulawesi in Indonesia.

References

Butterflies described in 1895
Hypolycaenini
Butterflies of Indonesia